Segundo Barrio may refer to:

 El Segundo Barrio in El Paso, Texas
 Second Ward, Houston, also known as Segundo Barrio
 Segundo (Ponce), one of the 31 barrios of Ponce, Puerto Rico